Syd Moore (born Samantha Moore,) is a British bestselling novelist, former television presenter and activist. Her debut novel, The Drowning Pool, was published in 2011 by HarperCollins. Her novels are mystery thrillers inspired by her research into the myths from the English county of Essex, where she grew up and lives.

Life and career
Syd Moore was born on 20 August in Essex. She is married and lives in Southend, Essex. Moore is a writer of suspense and mystery fiction.

After graduating, Moore travelled extensively through Europe, Asia and Australia before moving to London where she lived for 13 years while working for the publishers Random House.

Between 1997 and 2001 Moore presented the Channel 4 literary programme Pulp, which she describes as "a crazy time during the ladism culture of the Nineties where there were a lot of strong women in the public eye".

Moore taught publishing at South Essex College before studying for an MA in creative writing at City, University of London.

Moore was the founding editor of the Southend Arts and Culture magazine, Level 4, launched in January 2008 to bring together the creative aspects of Southend and to give an enthusiastic account of the area where she lives.

Literature
The Drowning Pool (2011). Avon Books. 
Witch Hunt (2012). AVON, a division of HarperCollins Publishers Ltd. 
If on a Winter's Night a Traveller Passes By (2013). ASIN B00H9GMSEO
Strange Magic: An Essex Witches Mystery (2017). Oneworld Publications. 
Strange Sight (2017). Oneworld Publications. 
Strange Fascination (2018). Oneworld Publications. 
Strange Tombs (2019). Oneworld Publications. 
The Twelve Strange Days of Christmas (2019). Oneworld Publications.

Activism
Syd campaigns against the negative stereotyping of Essex girls, drawing comparisons between the witch hunts that feature in her novels and the prejudice that exists against Essex girl today.

In 2011, Moore and artist Heidi Wigmore teamed up to produce the tongue-in-cheek card game Super Strumps, to celebrate women and the positive attributes of female stereotypes.

Personal life
In her personal time, Moore spends her spare time with her son, Riley and enjoys handcrafting soaps

References 

British women novelists
1967 births
Living people